Bryan Leitch (born June 17, 1984) is a Canadian professional ice hockey player who played the 2009-10 season in the ECHL.

Born in Coquitlam, British Columbia, Leitch played three seasons of junior hockey in the British Columbia Hockey League with the Coquitlam Express and Merritt Centennials before attending Quinnipiac University where he played four seasons with the Quinnipiac Bobcats men's ice hockey team, which competes in NCAA's Division I in the ECAC conference. He made an immediate impact in ECAC and was named the ECAC Rookie of the Year for the 2005–06 season.

In four seasons as a Bobcat, Leitch clicked for 169 points and 124 penalty minutes in 157 games, including his senior year (2008–09) when he registered 59 points to earn the title as the top scorer in NCAA Division I in ice hockey, and was a finalist for the Hobey Baker Award awarded to the NCAA men's top ice hockey player.

Following his standout college career, Leitch signed with the Milwaukee Admirals of the American Hockey League and was assigned to the Cincinnati Cyclones of the ECHL where he began the 2009–10 season.

Leitch currently resides in Hamden, CT.

Awards and honours

References

External links

1984 births
Alaska Aces (ECHL) players
Canadian ice hockey left wingers
Cincinnati Cyclones (ECHL) players
Florida Everblades players
Ice hockey people from British Columbia
Kalamazoo Wings (ECHL) players
Living people
People from Coquitlam
Quinnipiac Bobcats men's ice hockey players
Toledo Walleye players
Victoria Salmon Kings players